Pakriguri is a small village near Salbari Bazaar in Baksa district in Indian state of Assam.

References

Villages in Baksa district